Kai Mahler (born 11 September 1995) is a Swiss freestyle skier who grew up in Fischenthal, Switzerland.
His mother is from Germany and his father is from Switzerland. He won a silver medal in the Big Air competition at Winter X Games XVI. Kai is currently sponsored by Redbull, K2, Marker, Buff, Electric, Audi, Sporthilfe, Full Tilt, Sportmittelschule, and Swisscom. 
Kai has appeared in X-Games twice, both times receiving silver medals in the Big Air Competition. 
Other major competition results include a second place at Freestyle.ch in Switzerland in 2012, and in 2011, a first-place finish at the Frost Gun Invitational in France, as well as many other strong finishes.

References

External links
 
 
 
 
 http://www.kai-mahler.ch/97/Gästebuch/Sponsors.html 

 

1995 births
Living people
Swiss male freestyle skiers
Freestyle skiers at the 2014 Winter Olympics
Olympic freestyle skiers of Switzerland
Freestyle skiers at the 2012 Winter Youth Olympics
X Games athletes
Youth Olympic gold medalists for Switzerland
21st-century Swiss people